Primož Čerin (born 31 May 1962) is a Yugoslav former professional racing cyclist. He rode in two editions of the Tour de France, one edition of the Giro d'Italia and two editions of the Vuelta a España. He also competed in two events at the 1984 Summer Olympics.

References

External links

1962 births
Living people
Yugoslav male cyclists
Sportspeople from Ljubljana
Cyclists at the 1984 Summer Olympics
Olympic cyclists of Yugoslavia
Slovenian male cyclists